Presidential Office Building may refer to:

Presidential Office Building (Kyiv)
Presidential Office Building (Republic of China)
Presidential Office Building, Tirana
Presidential Palace (Nanjing)